Rachel Corbett may refer to:

 Rachel Corbett (art journalist), American art writer
 Rachel Corbett (radio presenter), Australian journalist